The 1978–79 Football League season was Birmingham City Football Club's 76th in the Football League and their 45th in the First Division. They were in the bottom two positions in the 22-team division from 9 September onwards, eventually finishing 21st position, so were relegated to the Second Division for 1979–80. They lost in their opening matches in both the 1978–79 FA Cup and the League Cup, eliminated by Burnley and Southampton respectively.

Twenty-seven players made at least one appearance in nationally organised first-team competition, and there were thirteen different goalscorers. Defender Joe Gallagher played in every game but one over the season, and Alan Buckley was the club's top scorer with 8 goals, all scored in the league. Jim Smith, in his first full season as Birmingham's manager, brought Argentina's World Cup-winning full-back Alberto Tarantini to the club.

Trevor Francis, who joined Birmingham as a 15-year-old, became the first British footballer to be transferred for a fee of at least £1 million when Brian Clough signed him for league champions Nottingham Forest in February 1979. The basic fee was below £1m – Clough claimed in his autobiography to have set the fee at £999,999 because he did not want the idea of being the first £1m player going to Francis's head – but VAT and the transfer levy raised the total payable to £1.18m. Within three months he scored the winning goal in the 1979 European Cup Final.

Football League First Division

League table (part)

FA Cup

League Cup

Appearances and goals

Numbers in parentheses denote appearances as substitute.
Players with name struck through and marked  left the club during the playing season.
Players with names in italics and marked * were on loan from another club for the whole of their season with Birmingham.

See also
Birmingham City F.C. seasons

References
General
 
 
 Source for match dates and results: 
 Source for lineups, appearances, goalscorers and attendances: Matthews (2010), Complete Record, pp. 392–93.

Specific

Birmingham City F.C. seasons
Birmingham City